Take the Sadness Out of Saturday Night is the third studio album by American indie pop act Bleachers, released on July 30, 2021, by RCA Records.

Background
Jack Antonoff began recording the album in late 2019, while the band embarked on a three day "mini-tour" called the "I Love Making This Album but I'm Also Losing My Mind in Here & Need to Come Out and Play" Tour. On January 6, 2020, Antonoff announced on Twitter that a new Bleachers album would come within the year, though that did not come to pass.

Promotion
Throughout 2020, Bleachers' official Twitter account started teasing the phrase "Take the Sadness Out of Saturday Night" and starting on November 14, 2020 a phone tree was set up for fans to call to hear clips from the song. On November 16, 2020, Bleachers released the lead singles "45" and "Chinatown", the latter featuring Bruce Springsteen. The same day it was announced that the album will be released in 2021. On May 18, 2021, the third single "Stop Making This Hurt" was released, alongside the album's pre-order.

On May 26, 2021, Bleachers performed the song "How Dare You Want More" on The Tonight Show with Jimmy Fallon. The song was released as the album's fourth single on June 9, 2021. Bleachers will promote the album with a 33-city tour across North America. "Secret Life" featuring Lana Del Rey was released as a promotional single on July 28, 2021. "How Dare You Want More" was sent to alternative radio and adult alternative radio on January 24, 2022.

Composition
Take the Sadness Out of Saturday Night is a synth-pop, indie pop,  and slow rock album with elements of  pop rock, rock n roll, alternative rock, arena rock, alt-pop, folk, baroque pop, rockabilly, and psychedelic music. The album was conceived after a breakup in 2017 and completed during the COVID-19 pandemic. It sees Antonoff expand Bleachers' musical horizons beyond the sounds of the 1980s, with a sound compared to artists like Bruce Springsteen, the Beatles, Arcade Fire, Sufjan Stevens, Vampire Weekend, the Chicks, Dirty Beaches, and Destroyer.

Critical reception

The album received favorable reviews from critics. On Metacritic, the album scored 71 out of 100 indicating "generally favorable reviews". Jon Blisten of Rolling Stone called the album Bleachers' "most cohesive album yet", and praised Antonoff for expanding the band's sound but criticized some of his lyricism." Ethan Shanfeld of Variety said the album sees Antonoff "shelving his signature grandiosity for a more stripped-down approach." Exclaim! writer Kyle Krohner called the album "at best a heartfelt batch of tracks that are nice to experience in the moment, but rarely anytime after."

Matt Mitchell, writing for Paste gave the album a negative review, calling it "mediocrity promoted as homage, showing itself as hastily thrown-together soundcheck warm-up fusion". Jeremy Larson, writing for Pitchfork, criticized the abundant use of slapback rockabilly-style echo and the solos in one of the songs ("It's rare to find a moment on any record where it seems worth remarking how bad a solo sounds, but there it is"), and said, "It is mostly inspired, sometimes interesting, and occasionally banal".

Track listing

Personnel
Credits adapted from Tidal.

Musicians

 Jack Antonoff – vocals (all tracks), electric guitar (1–4, 6–8, 10), keyboards (1–3, 7, 9, 10), acoustic guitar (2–10), bass (2–4, 6, 7), drum machine (2), twelve-string guitar (3, 4), drums (3, 4, 6, 7), organ (3), piano (3, 4, 9, 10), percussion (4, 6, 7), synthesizer (4, 7, 10), cello (8)
 Zadie Smith – background vocals (1)
 Patrik Berger – background vocals (1–3, 5, 8, 10), electric guitar (1–5, 7, 8, 10), synthesizer (1, 2, 4), glockenspiel (2, 5), acoustic guitar (3, 5, 8, 10), drums (3, 7), piano (3–5), programming (3, 7), bass (4, 5, 8), twelve-string guitar (5), drum machine (5, 7), tom toms (6), percussion (7)
 Jacob Braun – cello (1, 2, 7)
 Warren Ellis – synthesizer, violin (1)
 Serena McKinney Göransson – violin (1, 2, 7)
 Mikey Freedom Hart – electric guitar (2, 6), background vocals (3, 10), organ (3), bass (6), synthesizer (9)
 Evan Smith – synthesizer (2, 3, 6, 7), saxophone (3, 6, 7, 9, 10), background vocals (4), flute (9, 10)
 Bruce Springsteen – vocals (2)
 Sean Hutchinson – background vocals (3, 4), drums (3, 4, 6, 7), congas (6), percussion (7)
 Michael Riddleberger – background vocals (3, 4), drums (3), percussion (4, 6), snare drum (6)
 Zem Audu – saxophone (3, 6)
 Lana Del Rey – vocals (5), background vocals (7)
 Annie Clark – background vocals (6)
 Blu DeTiger – bass (6)
 Sounwave – programming (6)
 Anna Webber – saxophone (6)
 Bobby Hawk – violin (6)
 The Chicks – background vocals (7)
 Aaron Dessner – piano, synthesizer (7)

Technical

 Chris Gehringer – mastering engineer
 Jack Antonoff – mixing engineer (1, 4, 5, 7, 9, 10)
 Laura Sisk – mixing engineer (1, 4, 5, 7–10), engineer (all tracks)
 Mark "Spike" Stent – mixing engineer (2, 3, 6)
 John Rooney – engineer (3), assistant engineer (1, 2, 4, 5, 7–10)
 Jon Sher – assistant engineer (1–7)
 Will Quinnell – assistant engineer (2–10)
 Matt Wolach – assistant engineer (2, 3, 6)
 Rob Lebret – assistant engineer (2, 6)

Artwork
 Clare Gillen – creative director
 Michelle Holme – design
 Aaron Denton – illustrations
 Carlotta Kohl – photography

Charts

References

 

2021 albums
Bleachers (band) albums
Albums produced by Jack Antonoff
Albums produced by St. Vincent (musician)
RCA Records albums